Rachel Norah Fox-Crosbee (born 6 May 1969 in Harpenden) is a British slalom canoeist who competed at the international level from 1988 to 2000.

She won four medals in the K1 team event at the ICF Canoe Slalom World Championships with a silver (1995) and three bronzes (1993, 1997, 1999). She also won a silver medal in the same event at the 1998 European Championships in Roudnice nad Labem.

Crosbee also competed in two Summer Olympics, earning her best finish of 16th K1 event at the 1992 Summer Olympics in Barcelona.

She is the younger sister of Richard Fox, sister-in-law of Myriam Fox-Jerusalmi and aunt to Jessica Fox and Noemie Fox, all slalom canoeists.

World Cup individual podiums

References

1969 births
English female canoeists
Canoeists at the 1992 Summer Olympics
Canoeists at the 1996 Summer Olympics
Living people
Olympic canoeists of Great Britain
British female canoeists
People from Harpenden
Medalists at the ICF Canoe Slalom World Championships